Fasori Gimnázium (lit. "secondary school on the tree-lined avenue"; fasori=tree lined, gimnazium=secondary school), also known as Fasori Evangélikus Gimnázium ("Fasori" Lutheran Secondary School), official name: Budapest-Fasori Evangélikus Gimnázium, is a famous secondary school in Budapest, Hungary. It is located near the City Park.

History
The school was founded by the Lutheran Church in 1823. It was originally situated at Deák Ferenc square, but moved to Sütő utca in 1864, and finally to its current location in Városligeti fasor ("Tree lined Avenue to the City Park") in 1904, receiving its present nickname. In the first decades of its existence it operated as a German-language institution, and in 1847 Hungarian became the language of instruction  It had to close in 1952 under Communist pressure. The Fasori Gimnázium re-opened in 1989.

Notable faculty
László Rátz was a legendary teacher of mathematics in the school, after whom a Medal and an Achievement Award was later named.

Notable alumni
 Julius Elischer (architect)
 György Faludy (poet)
 Miksa Fenyő (writer and politician)
 Andrew Grove (businessman, engineer, and CEO of Intel Corporation)
 Alfréd Haar (mathematician)
 John Harsanyi (Nobel Prize winner economist)
 György Pásztor (ice hockey player, Order of Merit of the Republic of Hungary)
 Thomas Sebeok (linguist and semiotician)
 Aurel Stein (archaeologist)
 Edward Teller (physicist)
 John von Neumann (mathematician and polymath)
 Eugene Wigner (Nobel Prize winner physicist and mathematician)

See also
List of notable secondary schools in Hungary

References

External links

Website 

Gymnasiums in Hungary
Schools in Budapest
1823 establishments in the Austrian Empire
19th-century establishments in Hungary
Educational institutions established in 1823